Robert William Stewart (June 24, 1915 – December 20, 1981) was a professional baseball umpire who worked in the American League from 1958 to 1970. Stewart umpired 1,958 major league games in his 13-year career. He umpired in three World Series (1961, 1965 and 1970), two All-Star Games (1962 and 1969) and the 1969 American League Championship Series.

Steward served as a police officer for the Woonsocket, Rhode Island Police Department from 1943 to 1945.

References

External links
The Sporting News umpire card

1915 births
1981 deaths
American police officers
Baseball people from Massachusetts
Major League Baseball umpires
Sportspeople from Worcester County, Massachusetts
People from Blackstone, Massachusetts